Savage Circus is a German/Swedish power metal band originally formed as a side project by Thomas "Thomen" Stauch before leaving Blind Guardian.

History

Formation and Dreamland Manor 
Savage Circus began when Stauch asked his friend Piet Sielck if he was interested in joining Thomen's new project, which he was. Piet then introduced a Swedish band called Persuader to Thomen. Thomen liked the band and also liked the fact that the vocalist sounded very much like Hansi Kürsch. Thomen immediately said that he wanted to have Jens Carlsson (singer of Persuader) in the band. Jens brought with him Persuader guitarist Emil Norberg. Their debut album, Dreamland Manor, was released in August 2005.

Of Doom and Death 
Thomen Stauch was dismissed from the band on 17 August 2007 due to his frail health, leading to the cancellation of many shows. In September 2007, Mike Terrana joined the band as the new drummer. At the same time Yenz Leonhardt became a full member of the band. The release of the Dreamland Manor's follow-up, Of Doom and Death, was originally expected to be released in early 2009 but was pushed back to 23 October.

Next album 
In 2011, Piet Sielck left the band to concentrate more on his main band Iron Savior. Upon leaving, Piet said he was putting the fate of the band into the hands of members Jens and Emil. In 2012, Mike Terrana left to work with vocalist Tarja Turunen. Eventually Yenz Leonhardt also left, leaving only remaining members Jens and Emil. Later in 2012, the comeback of Thomen Stauch to the band was announced, together with the addition of second guitarist Thorsten "Toto" Hain and keyboardist Michael "Mi" Schüren. On 9 February 2014 Jens and Emil announced them leaving the band citing conflicting schedules with Savage Circus and their main band Persuader as the reason. Although no official announcement has been made, in a picture posted on the band's official Facebook page by Toto on 20 March Axel Morgan is mentioned as a member of "SC 3.0".

The band is currently working on a third album. As of 18 November 2014 there has been no further updates regarding the band's third studio album. The future of the band remains unclear, as Thomen has started a new band called Serious Black, Toto has returned to his previous band, Wortmord, and Mi will be touring excessively with Blind Guardian during 2015–2016.

Background

Musical style 
The musical style is similar to both Blind Guardian and Persuader due to the singing style and multi-layered vocals used in the band. The band's first two albums also contain some elements of Iron Savior, due to Piet Sielck's writing.

Band name 
Piet Sielck came up with the band's name. The word circus, refers to the band's members being of several different nationalities. Originally the band consisted of German and Swedish members. Savage, on the other hand, is for "wild" music.

Vocals 
Jens Carlsson is often compared with sounding highly similar to Hansi Kürsch of Blind Guardian. In an interview after the release of Dreamland Manor, Thomen said that Hansi was fond of Jens, because:

Band members 

Current members

 Thomen Stauch – drums (2004–2007, 2012–present)
 Thorsten "Toto" Hain – guitars (2012–present)
 Michael "Mi" Schüren – keyboards (2012–present)
 Axel Morgan – guitars (2014–present)

Former members
 Jens Carlsson – lead vocals (2004–2014)
 Emil Norberg – guitars (2004–2014)
 Piet Sielck – guitars, backing vocals (2004–2011), bass (2004–2006)
 Mike Terrana – drums, percussion (2007–2012)
 Yenz Leonhardt – bass, backing vocals (2006–2012)

Timeline

Discography

Studio albums 
 Dreamland Manor (2005)
 Of Doom and Death (2009)

DVDs 
 Live in Atlanta (2007)

References

External links 
 
Savage Circus Facebook

Musical groups established in 2004
German power metal musical groups
Century Media Records artists